Venezuelan Argentines are Argentine citizens of partial or full Venezuelan descent, or Venezuelan citizens who have migrated to and settled in Argentina. As of 2021, there are 179,203 Venezuelans living in Argentina, most of whom migrated during the latter half of the 2010s as part of the Venezuelan refugee crisis. The last census held in Argentina, in 2010, registered only 6,000 Venezuelan migrants living in the country.

As of 2018, Venezuelans were the fourth-largest expat community in Argentina, behind Paraguayans, Bolivians and Chileans. According to IOM figures, Argentina granted 170,223 residency permits to Venezuelan citizens alone from 2018 to 2020, nearly twice as many as to Paraguayan citizens. This makes Venezuelans the fastest-growing expat community in the country.

Characteristics
The Venezuelan community in Argentina has grown considerably since 2015 due to a number of factors, most notably, the ongoing socioeconomic crisis experienced by the Caribbean country. Despite the geographical distance between the two countries (there are 1920 miles between Venezuela's southernmost city and Argentina's northernmost), Argentina's lax migration laws have made the country a major destination for Venezuelans.

According to a 2019 IOM report studying Venezuelan migrants in Buenos Aires, 80.4% of respondents had jobs at the time the study was conducted (August–September 2019): 55% as employees and 25.4% as independent workers; 15.6% were unemployed. Around 70% of the surveyed migrants counted with a monthly salary ranging between Argentina's mandated minimum wage and twice that amount. By business sector, 43% were active in commerce, 26% in transport (taxi cabs and mobility apps and services such as Uber), 6% in health, and 3% in IT. Nearly 71% of the surveyed migrants worked in the informal economy, while 29% worked in registered jobs.

Notable people
Brenda Asnicar (born 1991), actress
Grecia Colmenares (born 1963), actress
Catherine Fulop (born 1965), model
Ángel David Revilla (born 1982), YouTuber
Oriana Sabatini (born 1996), actress

See also
Argentina–Venezuela relations
Immigration to Argentina
Bolivarian diaspora
Argentine Venezuelans

References

External links

ASOVEN – Asociación de Venezolanos en Argentina (in Spanish)

Immigration to Argentina
+